The Deanery of Reading lies within the Church of England Archdeaconry of Berkshire in the Diocese of Oxford.
As of 2007, there were reported to be 3,428 members of churches within the deanery.

Deans

Rural deans
 1859 Rev. John Wilder

Area deans
 -2013:  Canon Brian Shenton
 2014-2017: Rev'd Stephen Pullin
 2017- : Rev'd Dr Graeme Fancourt

Churches
There are 39 churches in the Deanery of Reading, as of 2015:

 St Mary The Virgin, Beech Hill
 Caversham Park (LEP)
 St Andrew, Caversham
 St John the Baptist, Caversham
 St Peter, Caversham
 St Nicolas, Earley
 St Peter, Earley
 St Barnabas, Emmer Green
 Trinity Church, Lower Earley
 St Margaret's, Mapledurham
 All Saints, Reading
 Christ Church, Reading
 Greyfriars, Reading
 Holy Trinity, Reading
 Minister of St Mary the Virgin, Reading
 New Hope Community Church, Reading
 St Agnes, Reading
 St Barnabas, Reading
 St Bartholomew, Reading
 St Giles, Reading
 St John the Evangelist and St Stephen, Reading
 St Laurence, Reading
 St Luke, Reading
 St Mark, Reading
 St Matthews, Reading
 St Paul, Reading
 St Mary's, Shinfield
 St Michael's & All Angels, Spencer's Wood
 All Saints, Swallowfield
 Cornwell Community Church, Tilehurst
 St Birinus Mission, Tilehurst
 St Catherine of Sienna, Tilehurst
 St George, Tilehurst
 St Mary Magdalen, Tilehurst
 St Michael, Tilehurst
 Airfield, Woodley
 Emmanuel, Woodley
 St James, Woodley
 St John the Evangelist, Woodley

References

External links
Deanery website
Deanery map

Diocese of Oxford
Deaneries of the Church of England